Nadeem (also spelled Nadim or Nedim) is an Arabic masculine given name. It means  "companion", "confidant" or "friend". Originates from the plural word "Nadama""نَدامَى" which means, drink to forget. Nadim is the pourer of wine, the best friend.

The name is common among many communities, including Christians, Muslims and Jews, in the greater Middle East, the Balkans, and South Asia.

Arabic literature definition and origin: 
"النَّدِيم : المصاحبُ على الشراب المسامرُ والجمع : نِدَام، ونُدَماءُ" 
https://www.almaany.com/ar/dict/ar-ar/%D9%86%D8%AF%D9%8A%D9%85/

People with the given name

Nadeem
 Nadeem Abbasi (born 1968), former Pakistani cricketer
 Nadeem Ahmad, Pakistani army general
 Nadeem Ahmed (born 1987), Hong Kong cricketer
 Nadeem Aslam (born 1966), British novelist of Pakistani origin
 Nadeem Baig (born 1941), film actor, producer, singer
 Nadeem Ghauri (born 1962), former Pakistani cricketer
 Nadeem Karim (born 1989), Iraqi footballer
 Nadeem Khan (born 1969), former Pakistani cricketer
 Nadeem Malik (born 1982), English cricketer
 Nadeem Malik (Pakistani journalist) (born 1968), Pakistani journalist
 Nadeem Saifi, Indian music director
 Nadeem Shahid (born 1969), English first-class cricketer
 Nadeem Siddique (born 1977), British Pakistani boxer
 Nadeem Taj (born 1953), Pakistani general

Nadim
 Nadim Abbas (born 1980), Hong Kong artist
 Nadim al-Jabiri (born 1959), Iraqi politician
 Nadim al-Pachachi (1914–1976), Iraqi Secretary-General of OPEC
 Nadim Asfar (born 1976), Lebanese photographer and filmmaker
 Nadim Barghouthi (born 1989), Palestinian footballer
 Nadim Gemayel (born 1982), Lebanese MP
 Nadim Karam (born 1957), Lebanese artist
 Nadim Kassar (born 1964), Lebanese businessman
 Nadim Kobeissi (born 1990), Lebanese-Canadian computer programmer and security researcher
 Nadim Nassar, Syrian priest
 Nadim Sabagh (born 1985), Syrian footballer
 Nadim Sadek (born 1962), Irish-Egyptian entrepreneur
 Nadim Sawalha (born 1935), English actor

Nedim

First name
 Nedîm (1681–1730), Ottoman Turkish poet
 Nedim Dal (born 1975), Bosnian-born Turkish national basketball player
 Nedim Đedović (born 1997), Bosnian basketball player
 Nedim Doğan (born 1943), Turkish football player
 Nedim Durić (born 1993), Bosnian football player
 Nedim Günar (1932–2011), Turkish football player
 Nedim Gürsel (born 1951), Turkish writer
 Nedim Halilović (born 1979), Bosnian footballer
 Nedim Hasanbegović (born 1988), German footballer of Bosnian descent
 Nedim Imac (1966–2007), Turkish-Dutch businessman and sports executive
 Nedim Jusufbegović (born 1974), Bosnian football manager and former player
 Nedim Kufi (born 1962), Iraqi-Dutch visual artist
 Nedim Nišić (born 1984), Bosnian-American Olympic swimmer
 Nedim Ökmen (1908–1967), Turkish economist and politician
 Nedim Şener (born 1966), Turkish writer and journalist
 Nedim Tutić (born 1968), Bosnian former football player
 Nedim Yücel (born 1979), Turkish basketball player

Middle name
 Mahmud Nedim Pasha (1818–1883), Ottoman Turkish statesman
 Mahmut Nedim Hendek (1880–1920), Ottoman Turkish military officer

People with the surname

Nadeem
 Ahmed Nadeem (born 1976), United Arab Emirati cricketer
 Aida Nadeem (born 1965), Iraqi musician
 Francis Nadeem (1955–2020), Pakistani priest
 Khan Muttaqi Nadeem (1940–2006), Pakistani lawyer
 Muhammad Nadeem, Pakistani field hockey player
 Razaq Nadeem, Pakistani murderer
 Savera Nadeem, Pakistani television actor
 Shahbaz Nadeem (born 1989), Indian cricketer
 Shahid Nadeem (born 1947), Pakistani journalist, playwright, screenwriter, director, human rights activist
 Waheed Nadeem (born 1987), Afghan footballer

Nadim
 Dinanath Nadim (1916–1988), Kashmiri poet
 Laksamana Hang Nadim, 16th century Malaysian warrior
 Nadia Nadim (born 1988), Afghanistan–born Danish footballer

See also
 Nadim al-Maghrebi, a Muslim militant organization which seeks to remove Ceuta and Melilla from Spanish rule
 Nadeem Commando, Pakistani militant organisation
 Nadeem-Shravan, Indian musical duo (Nadeem Saifi and Shravan Rathod)
 Ibn al-Nadim, 10th-century Arabic author of Kitāb al-Fihrist (“The Book Catalogue”).

References

Arabic masculine given names
Bosniak masculine given names
Bosnian masculine given names
Indian masculine given names
Pakistani masculine given names
Turkish masculine given names